Dolu Nadir Hawa O Annanya Galpo is a Bengali short story collection written by Shahidul Zahir. This is Zahir's third collection of short stories published by Mowla Brothers on 1 January 2004 in Bangladesh. It compiled seven stories, written between 1999 and 2003. In the background of the stories, there are various contexts and curiosities related to the people from Bhuter Goli (Bhajahari Saha Street) at Puran Dhaka and villagers, and the love, dreams and dream-breaking of the people.

The title of the book taken from the river Dolu, which flows through Lohagara through the eastern hilly region of Bandarban and Satkania in Chittagong district of Bangladesh. Zaheer lived in Satkania for some time before his secondary examination and studied at Satkania Adarsh High School.

The book won Kagaz Sahitya Puraskar in 2004.

Contents

Award

References

2004 short story collections
Bengali-language literature
Bangladesh in fiction